The 1959 Washington State Cougars football team was an American football team that represented Washington State University as an independent during the 1959 NCAA University Division football season. In their fourth season under head coach Jim Sutherland, the Cougars compiled a 6–4 record and outscored their opponents 177 to 121.

The team's statistical leaders included Mel Melin with 526 passing yards, Keith Lincoln with 670 rushing yards, and Gail Cogdill with 531 receiving yards. The Cougars had only three home games this season: the season opener in Spokane (at night) and two on campus in Pullman.

This was the first season after the disbandment of the Pacific Coast Conference, and the first as "Washington State University." After three years as an independent, WSU became the sixth member of the AAWU in 1962.

Schedule

NFL Draft
Two Cougars were selected in the 1960 NFL Draft, which was twenty rounds (240 selections).

References

External links
 Game program: California vs. WSU at Spokane – September 19, 1959
 Game program: Idaho at WSU – October 24, 1959
 Game program: Oregon at WSU – November 14, 1959

Washington State
Washington State Cougars football seasons
Washington State Cougars football